Allen Law (born 1980) is a Hong Kong-born business magnate and chief executive officer (CEO) of the family-founded Park Hotel Group.

Background and family
Allen Law was born in Hong Kong to a working-class family, which found success years later. Law's father, Law Kar Po (born 1948), first started off as a small-time clothing merchant with his father, before switching to real estate. As of 2013, he is listed by Forbes as the thirty-sixth richest person in Hong Kong, with an estimated net worth of $1.06 billion. Law's mother (born after 1963) is a homemaker who used to help out at the family's clothing business. Law is the second child in the family. He has two sisters, a businesswoman in the fashion industry and a homemaker. His grandfather is Law Ting Pong, the founder of Bossini.

Early life and career
Following the success of their venture, Bossini, the family sent Law to Uppingham School, wanting him to receive a better education there. While attending the British boarding school, he was a victim of bullying. Law credits the experience of being bullied as the reason he learnt to "fend for himself". At Uppingham, Law also tried his hand at cooking as well as a handful of sports. After graduating from the institution in 2003, Law was requested by his father to assist in the overseas expansion of the family's hotel business, Park Hotel Group. He had initially wanted to stay in Britain to work as a banker, insurer, or acupuncturist. Then aged 25, he clinched the $300 million purchase of Crown Prince Hotel in Orchard Road, Singapore. Later on, Law returned to the United Kingdom to further his education. Applying for British citizenship and renting a residence in Covent Garden, he studied mathematics and management at King's College London. Back in Singapore, where he headed the operations at Crown Prince, Law had to simultaneously serve as the stand-in human resource manager, housekeeping manager, front-office manager, and general manager. He currently is the chief executive officer of Park Hotel Group.

Personal life
Law is a permanent resident in Singapore. In 2010, Law married Shin Hui (née Tan), the second daughter of hotelier Wee Wei Ling, businessman Wee Cho Yaw's daughter. They were introduced after the two families met to discuss professional issues by Wei Ling. Law and Tan's first child, a son Ian, was born in around mid-2011. Their second child Bryan, also a son, was born in July 2013.

References

1980 births
Living people
Alumni of King's College London
Hong Kong chief executives